Luccas Neto Ferreira (born February 8, 1992) is a Brazilian actor and comedian.

Career

YouTube
On 10 February 2017, he uploaded his first video.

His channel reached 100,000 subscribers in 2016, 1,000,000 subscribers in 2017, and 10,000,000 subscribers also in 2017.

As of December 2019, his channel's total views add up to over 8 billion.

References

External links
 Luccas Neto on YouTube

1992 births
Brazilian people of Portuguese descent
Brazilian YouTubers
Living people
People from Rio de Janeiro (city)